Alec Waterman (born 19 August 1996) is an Australian rules footballer who formerly played for Essendon in the Australian Football League (AFL).

He was initially selected at pick 76 as a father son selection by West Coast in the 2014 AFL draft but failed to play a game.  After various health and injury issues, including glandular fever and a post-viral fatigue illness, he was delisted at the conclusion of the 2016 season.

After an impressive 2020 season with WAFL club Claremont, where he kicked the most goals for the season in the league, he was invited to train with Essendon over the 2021 preseason. At the conclusion of the preseason he was signed by Essendon as pre-season supplemental selection. He made his debut for the Bombers in round 3, 2021 against St Kilda. He collected 12 disposals and 2 goals in a huge 75 point win for the club. On June 9, 2021 Essendon announced that Waterman had agreed to a one year deal to remain on the rookie list for the 2022 season.

He is the son of former West Coast premiership player Chris Waterman, and brother of current West Coast Eagles player Jake Waterman.

References

External links

Essendon Football Club players
East Perth Football Club players
Claremont Football Club players
Australian rules footballers from Western Australia
1996 births
Living people